Shereen F. Ratnagar is an Indian archaeologist whose work has focused on the Indus Valley civilization. She is the author of several books and academic textbooks.

Career
Ratnagar was educated at Deccan College, University of Pune. She studied Mesopotamian archaeology at the Institute of Archaeology, University College London.

She was a professor of archaeology and ancient history at the Centre for Historical Studies at the Jawaharlal Nehru University, Delhi. She retired in 2000, and is currently an independent researcher living in Mumbai. She is noted for work on investigating the factors contributing to the end of the Indus Valley Civilization.

Ayodhya dispute
Shereen Ratnagar along with archaeologist D. Mandal spent a day, in 2003, examining the court-ordered excavations conducted by the Archaeological Survey of India (ASI) at the site of the Babri Masjid on behalf of the Sunni Central Waqf Board (the Muslim litigant in the dispute). Subsequently, the two researchers wrote a highly critical appraisal of the excavations by the ASI titled Ayodhya: Archaeology after Excavation. In 2010, they appeared as expert witnesses for the Sunni Waqf Board in the Ram Janmabhoomi-Babri Masjid case in the Allahabad High Court.

In its judgement on the Ayodhya dispute, the High Court flayed the role played by several witnesses including Ratnagar, who was forced to admit under oath that she had no field experience in archaeological excavations in India. Ratnagar and her supporters defend her record by stating that she has participated in some archaeological digs at sites outside India, such as Tell al-Rimah, Iraq, in 1971, as well as in Turkey and the Gulf.

Earlier in the case, Shereen Ratnagar was served a contempt notice for violating a court order restraining witnesses in the ongoing case from airing their views in public.

Publications
Encounters, the westerly trade of the Harappa civilization, Oxford University Press (1981).
Enquiries into the political organization of Harappan society, Ravish Publishers (1991).
The End of the Great Harappan Tradition, New Delhi: Manohar, . (2000)
Understanding Harappa: Civilization in the greater Indus Valley, Tulika Books,  (2002)
Mobile and Marginalized Peoples, New Delhi: Manohar (2003)
Trading Encounters: From the Euphrates to the Indus in the Bronze Age, Oxford University Press (2nd edition),  (2006)
The Other Indians - Essays on Pastoralists and Prehistoric Tribal People, Three Essays Collective (2004)
Ayodhya: Archaeology After Excavation, New Delhi: Tulika Books (2007)
The Timechart History of Ancient Egypt, Worth (2007). .
Makers and Shapers: Early Indian Technology in the Household, Village, and Urban Workshop, Tulika Books (2007).
Being Tribal, Primus Books (2010). .

References

Historians of South Asia
20th-century Indian archaeologists
Indian social sciences writers
20th-century Indian women writers
20th-century Indian women scientists
20th-century Indian social scientists
Indian women archaeologists
Living people
Savitribai Phule Pune University alumni
Alumni of the UCL Institute of Archaeology
Academic staff of Jawaharlal Nehru University
Year of birth missing (living people)
Analysts of Ayodhya dispute
Indian women historians
Scientists from Maharashtra
Historians of India
Women writers from Maharashtra
Indian women science writers
21st-century Indian women scientists
21st-century Indian social scientists
21st-century Indian women writers
Women scientists from Maharashtra
21st-century Indian archaeologists
People associated with the Indus Valley civilisation
20th-century Indian non-fiction writers
21st-century Indian non-fiction writers
Parsi people
Women educators from Maharashtra
Educators from Maharashtra